Gottlieb Frederick Henry Schuler (23 February 1853 – 11 December 1926), who has been referred to authoritatively as G. Frederick H. Schuler or Schüler, was an Australian journalist, editor of The Age for 26 years from 1900.

Schuler was born in Heimerdingen, Württemberg, the son of Jacob Friderich Schüler and his wife Christine Catharine, née Frey, though arguably born at sea.
Around 1860 Schuler came to Australia with his parents and was educated at Sandhurst (now Bendigo, Victoria). After leaving school he joined the staff of the Bendigo Independent did much reading and gained an intimate acquaintance with English, French, and German literature. He later transferred  the Bendigo Advertiser, where he specialized as a mining reporter, and soon had much knowledge of the industry. In March 1879 he was given an appointment on the Melbourne newspaper The Age in connection with which he obtained an intimate acquaintance with Victorian politics.

Schuler became chief of staff in 1890 and prepared much of the material which led to the attack on the management of the railways, and the famous Speight action for libel. He was appointed editor of the Age on 1 January 1900 and held the position continuously for the remainder of his life. 
During the 1914–18 war he was vilified by opposition newspapers for his German origin despite protests that he was born at sea.
In 1917 his only son, Lieutenant Phillip F. E. Schuler, was killed in action in France. Phillip Schuler had been a war correspondent before enlisting in the First AIF and had published a book on the Gallipoli campaign, Australia in Arms, in 1916.

Schuler died suddenly at his home in Hawthorn, Melbourne, on 11 December 1926 leaving a widow and two daughters. Belonging as he did to the old school of anonymous journalism Schuler never came much before the public, but as chief of staff he showed great tact, and as editor had his finger on every department of the paper. It could be said that The Age lost prestige under his editorship, but circumstances in Australia were changing rapidly, it is unlikely that any newspaper will have the power wielded by The Age under David Syme and Arthur Windsor during the last quarter of the nineteenth century.

Family
Schuler married S. D. "Dolly" Strahan (c. 1863 – 19 July 1939) on 3 October 1888. She was totally blind, and a noted contributor to blindness support organisations.
They had two daughters and one son:
Minna Schuler (born 17 September 1894)
Phillip Frederick Edward Schuler (c. August 1893 – 23 June 1917)
Dorothy Schuler (born 18 September 1891) married John Denholm on 28 October 1916.

References

1853 births
1926 deaths
Australian journalists